KOUT (98.7 FM, "Kat Country 98.7") is a radio station licensed to serve Rapid City, South Dakota. The station is owned by HomeSlice Media Group, LLC. It airs a country music format.

The station was assigned the KOUT call letters by the Federal Communications Commission on November 29, 1991.

Notable on-air personalities include "The Roadhouse" with Amy & Brandon, Dean Taylor on mid-days, Mark Houston, the last original Kat Country personality, on afternoons, and syndicated shows The Big Time with Whitney Allen on evenings and The Blair Garner Show overnight.

Ownership
In May 1999, Triad Broadcasting reached a deal to acquire this station from brothers Jim and Tom Ingstad as part of a twelve-station deal valued at a reported $37.8 million.

In July 2006, Schurz Communications reached an agreement to buy this station from Triad Broadcasting Co. as part of a six-station deal valued at a reported $19 million. Schurz Communications created the Black Hills broadcast division, New Rushmore Radio, now known as Rushmore Media Company, Inc.

Schurz Communications announced on September 14, 2015 that it would exit broadcasting and sell its television and radio stations, including KOUT, to Gray Television for $442.5 million. Though Gray initially intended to keep Schurz' radio stations, on November 2, it announced that HomeSlice Media Group, LLC would acquire KOUT and the other Rushmore Media Company radio stations for $2.2 million; the deal reunites the stations with KBHB and KKLS, which HomeSlice acquired from Schurz in 2014 following its purchase of KOTA-TV. The sale to HomeSlice Media was consummated on February 15, 2016 at a price of $2.5 million.

References

External links
KOUT official website

OUT
Country radio stations in the United States
Pennington County, South Dakota